"Sometimes a Memory Ain't Enough" is a song written by Stan Kesler and originally recorded by Jerry Lee Lewis for his Kesler-produced Mercury Records' album of the same name (1973). It was also released as a single (with "I Think I Need to Pray" on the flip side), reaching number 3 on the Cash Box Country Singles chart and number 6 on the Billboard country chart.

Track listing 

Notes: "From Mercury's album Sometimes a Memory Ain't Enough SRM-1-677"

Charts

References 

1973 songs
1973 singles
Jerry Lee Lewis songs
Sun Records singles
American country music songs